Steffen Zillich (born 16 July 1971) is a German politician for the The Left and since 2016 member of the Abgeordnetenhaus of Berlin, the state parliament of Berlin.

Politics
Zillich was born 1971 in Berlin and studied law for eight years, then become a member of the Abgeordnetenhaus in 2016.

References

Living people
1971 births
21st-century German politicians
Members of the Abgeordnetenhaus of Berlin
Politicians from Berlin